Tutah Khaneh (also Romanized as Tūtah Khāneh; also known as Tūtā Khāneh) is a village in Benajuy-ye Shomali Rural District, in the Central District of Bonab County, East Azerbaijan Province, Iran. At the 2006 census, its population was 529, in 117 families.

References 

Populated places in Bonab County